The Kurram Tangi Dam is a multipurpose dam under construction on the Kaitu River in North Waziristan, Pakistan, with a 83.4 MW power generation capacity.

Location
The Kurram Tangi Dam is located across Kaitu River (which more downstream becomes the Kurram River), about 14 km upstream of Kurram Garhi Headworks and 32 km north of Bannu City in the Federally Administrated Tribal Area (FATA).

Irrigation system
The project will be constructed in two phases. Stage-I consists in a 18 ft-tall weir on Kaitu River. It will be completed within 3 years, and allow the irrigation of 16,000 acres of land in North Waziristan Agency, while about 18MW of electricity will be generated.

The complete system will irrigate a command area of 84,380 acres and have hydro-power generation capacity of 83.4 MW. The dam is also designed to supplement 278,000 acres of existing system of Civil and Marwat Canals.

Work Progress
In January 2013 USAID offered US$81 million for Keitu weir and irrigation. Italy offered US$45 Million for Command Area Development to be executed by FATA Secretariat.

On June 7, 2016, the Contract Agreement was signed and the Engineer's Order to Commence was issued a week later.

In July 2016, construction started. The foundation stone was laid on March 3, 2017, by Prime Minister Nawaz Sharif.

April 2019 was the estimated completion date for phase I. Construction works for phase II had not started yet as of February 2020.

The physical progress of the project is around 60.75%.

See also
List of dams and reservoirs in Pakistan

References

Dams in Pakistan
Hydroelectric power stations in Pakistan
Dams under construction